The group stage of the 2013 AFC Cup was played from 26 February to 1 May 2013. A total of 32 teams competed in the group stage.

Draw
The draw for the group stage was held on 6 December 2012, 15:00 UTC+8, at the AFC House in Kuala Lumpur, Malaysia. The 32 teams were drawn into eight groups of four. Teams from the same association could not be drawn into the same group.

The following 32 teams (16 from West Asia Zone, 16 from East Asia Zone) were entered into the group-stage draw, which included the 31 automatic qualifiers and the qualifying play-off winner, whose identity was not known at the time of the draw:

West Asia Zone (Groups A–D)
 Al-Riffa
 Al-Muharraq (later replaced by  Regar-TadAZ)
 Erbil
 Dohuk
 Al-Faisaly
 Al-Ramtha
 Al-Qadsia
 Al-Kuwait
 Safa
 Al-Ansar
 Fanja
 Dhofar
 Al-Shorta
 Ravshan Kulob
 Al-Shaab Ibb
Winner of play-off:  Al-Ahli Taizz

East Asia Zone (Groups E–H)
 Kitchee
 Sunray Cave JC Sun Hei
 East Bengal
 Churchill Brothers
 Semen Padang
 Persibo Bojonegoro
 Kelantan
 Selangor
 New Radiant
 Maziya
 Yangon United
 Ayeyawady United
 Tampines Rovers
 Warriors
 SHB Đà Nẵng
 Sài Gòn Xuân Thành

Al-Muharraq (Bahrain) withdrew after the draw was held. As a result, Regar-TadAZ (Tajikistan), which were initially to enter the qualifying play-off, instead directly entered the group stage, and only two teams participated in the qualifying play-off.

Format
In the group stage, each group was played on a home-and-away round-robin basis. The winners and runners-up of each group advanced to the round of 16.

Tiebreakers
The teams are ranked according to points (3 points for a win, 1 point for a tie, 0 points for a loss). If tied on points, tiebreakers are applied in the following order:
Greater number of points obtained in the group matches between the teams concerned
Goal difference resulting from the group matches between the teams concerned
Greater number of goals scored in the group matches between the teams concerned (away goals do not apply)
Goal difference in all the group matches
Greater number of goals scored in all the group matches
Penalty shoot-out if only two teams are involved and they are both on the field of play
Fewer score calculated according to the number of yellow and red cards received in the group matches (1 point for a single yellow card, 3 points for a red card as a consequence of two yellow cards, 3 points for a direct red card, 4 points for a yellow card followed by a direct red card)
Drawing of lots

Groups
The matchdays were 5–6 March, 12–13 March, 2–3 April, 9–10 April, 23–24 April, and 30 April–1 May 2013.

Group A

Tiebreakers
Al-Riffa are ranked ahead of Safa on head-to-head record.

Group B

Notes

Group C

Notes

Group D

Notes

Group E

Notes

Group F

Tiebreakers
New Radiant and Yangon United are tied on head-to-head record, and so are ranked by overall goal difference.

Notes

Group G

Notes

Group H

Tiebreakers
Selangor are ranked ahead of Sài Gòn Xuân Thành on head-to-head record.

Notes

References

External links

2